Grant Anderson is a Scotland 7s international  rugby union player. He plays for Ayr.

Rugby Union career

Amateur career

Anderson began his career with Greenock Wanderers.

In 2008 he was playing with Ayr.

He was top try scorer for Ayr in 2013-14.

Professional career

He was part of the Scottish National Academy in 2008-09, assigned to Glasgow Warriors.

International career

While part of the Greenock Wanderers squad he was called up to the Scotland U18 side for the U18 Six Nations tournament in 2007.

He was called up to the Scotland U20s in 2009 for the IRB Nations Cup.

He was part of the Scotland 7s side for the IRB World Series in George, South Africa.

He was called up to the Scotland 7s squad and played for them in the Dubai Sevens of 2007.

Called up again in 2008, he had to pull out of the 2008 IRB World Sevens series due to a knee injury. He was back in the squad in December 2008 for the South Africa Sevens.

He was called up again to the 7s side in 2010.

References

1989 births
Living people
Ayr RFC players
Glasgow Warriors players
Greenock Wanderers RFC players
Rugby union players from Gourock
Scotland international rugby sevens players
Scottish rugby union players